Kerb Crawler is a 1976 song by the UK rock group Hawkwind. It was originally released as a single in the UK (CB289) on 16 July 1976 taken from the album Astounding Sounds, Amazing Music.

There are reportedly two versions of the A-side, the original mix and a remix by David Gilmour, although the latter is the most common and the version that appeared on the album. The B-side, "Honky Dorky", is the band jamming on the middle section of "Reefer Madness".

References                 

Hawkwind songs
Songs written by Robert Calvert
Songs written by Dave Brock